The Presidents' Athletic Conference (PAC) is an athletic conference which competes in the NCAA's Division III. Of its 11 current member schools, all private, liberal arts institutions of higher learning, nine are located in Western Pennsylvania. The other two are located in areas adjacent and historically tied to Western Pennsylvania—Appalachian Ohio and the Northern Panhandle of West Virginia.

History
The PAC was founded in 1955 by the presidents of Western Reserve University (1955–1967, operating athletically as Adelbert College from 1967 to 1970), Case Institute of Technology (1955–1970), John Carroll University (1955–1988) and Wayne State University (1955–1967). Unlike other conferences at that time, the PAC was designed to be controlled by the presidents of the institutions rather than the athletic directors. Member institutions were to admit athletes on the same academic standards as other students and award scholarships only based on academic achievement or need.

By 1958, the PAC expanded east to include Allegheny College (1958–1984, 2022–present), Bethany College (1958–present), Thiel College (1958–present) and Washington & Jefferson College (1958–present). Eventually, many other member institutions joined the PAC, like Chatham University (2007–present), Geneva College (2007–present), Grove City College (1984–present), Saint Vincent College (2006–present), Thomas More College (2005–2018), Waynesburg University (1990–present) and Westminster College (2000–present).

Some former PAC member institutions include Alfred University (1996–1998), Carnegie Mellon University (1968–1989), Eastern Michigan University (1962–1967) and Hiram College (1972–1989). On May 31, 2017, Thomas More College, now designated as a "University", announced its withdrawal from the PAC at the conclusion of the 2017–18 school year.

In April 2019, Franciscan University, which had joined the PAC as an associate member in the newly launched conference sports of men's and women's lacrosse for the 2018–19 school year, was unveiled as the effective replacement for Thomas More. Franciscan added five sports to its PAC membership for 2019–20—women's golf, men's and women's indoor track & field, and men's and women's outdoor track & field, and became a full conference member in 2020–21.

Effective July 1, 2022, Allegheny College rejoined the PAC after a 38-year absence spent in the North Coast Athletic Conference. Allegheny remains an affiliate member of the NCAC in the sport of field hockey as the PAC does not currently sponsor the sport.

The headquarters is located in New Wilmington, Pennsylvania.

Chronological timeline

 1955 – Charter members Western Reserve University, John Carroll University, and Case Institute of Technology in Cleveland, along with Wayne State University in Detroit, come together to form the Presidents' Athletic Conference (PAC).
 1958 – The PAC adds four additional members - Allegheny College in Meadville, Pa.; Bethany College in Bethany, W.Va.; Thiel College in Greenville, Pa.; and Washington & Jefferson College in Washington, Pa., bringing the total number of conference members to eight.
 1962 – The PAC accepted the University of Ypsilanti (Eastern Michigan) as its ninth member.
 1966 – Wayne State and Eastern Michigan withdrew from the PAC following the 1966–67 academic year, leaving the conference with seven members.
 1967 – Case Institute of Technology and Western Reserve University federated into a new institution known as Case Western Reserve University. The undergraduate student bodies remained separate, however, and both Case Tech and Adelbert College (the male undergraduate school of the former Western Reserve University) continued to field separate teams.
 1968 – Carnegie Mellon University in Pittsburgh is accepted into the PAC.
 1970 – Case Western Reserve University begins to compete as one program, no longer fielding teams as Case Tech and Adelbert.
 1972 – Hiram College in Hiram, Ohio is accepted into the PAC.
 1983 – Allegheny College and Case Western Reserve University leave the PAC following the 1983–84 academic year.
 1984 – Grove City College in Grove City, Pa., is accepted into the PAC.
 1984–85 – The PAC sponsors women's athletic championships for the first time.
 1988 – John Carroll University leaves the PAC.
 1989 – Carnegie Mellon University and Hiram College leave the PAC.
 1990 – Waynesburg College (now University) in Waynesburg, Pa., is accepted into the PAC.
 1996 – Alfred College in Alfred, N.Y., is accepted into the PAC.
 1998 – Alfred College leaves the PAC.
 2000 – Westminster College in New Wilmington, Pa., is accepted into the PAC.
 2005 – Thomas More College (now University) in Crestview Hills, Ky., is accepted into the PAC.
 2006 – Saint Vincent College in Latrobe, Pa., is accepted into the PAC
 2007 – Geneva College in Beaver Falls, Pa., and Chatham University in Pittsburgh are both accepted into the PAC, bringing the conference to 10 full-time members.
 2011 – Carnegie Mellon University in Pittsburgh and Case Western Reserve in Cleveland are both admitted to the PAC as affiliate members in the sport of football beginning in the 2014–15 academic year.
 2018
 Thomas More left the PAC for the American Collegiate Athletic Association (ACAA); it was an ACAA member for only one year, as it returned to the NAIA in 2019 as a member of the Mid-South Conference.
 Franciscan University of Steubenville, in the Ohio city of that name, joined the PAC for men's and women's lacrosse.
 2019 – Franciscan added women's golf plus indoor and outdoor track & field for both men and women to its PAC membership.
 2020 – Franciscan became a full PAC member.
 2022 – Allegheny rejoined the PAC effective July 1.

Member schools

Current members
The Presidents' currently has 11 full members, all private schools.

Notes

Associate members
The Presidents' currently has two associate members, both of which joined for football only since the 2014 fall season (2014–15 school year) and have remained in PAC football to this day.

Notes

Former members
The Presidents' has 10 former full members, with all but two being private schools.

Notes

Membership timeline

Sports

References

External links